Harold Pope Jr. is an American politician and retired United States Air Force officer serving as a member of the New Mexico Senate from the 23rd district. Elected in 2020, he defeated incumbent Republican Sander Rue. He assumed office on January 19, 2021.

Early life and education 
Pope was born and raised in Pueblo, Colorado. After graduating from high school, he enlisted in the United States Air Force and worked as a dental technician. Pope then left active duty and enlisted in the Air Force Reserve, earning Bachelor of Science degree in biochemistry from the University of New Mexico. After graduation he was commissioned through the Air Force ROTC program and went back on active duty serving as a Chemist & Acquisitions Officer.  Pope later earned a Master of Science in pharmaceutical chemistry from the University of Florida and a Master of Arts in operational leadership from the Air Command and Staff College.

Career 
After earning his bachelors degree, Pope was commissioned in the Air Force as an officer, working as a acquisitions officer and chemist. He specialized in satellite programs, weapon systems, and nuclear deterrence. After his retirement, Pope was appointed as a facilities transition advisor in the administration of Albuquerque Mayor Tim Keller. In the November general election for the New Mexico Senate, Pope defeated incumbent Republican Sander Rue. When Pope assumed office in 2021, he became the first African-American member of the New Mexico Senate.

References 

Living people
People from Pueblo, Colorado
University of New Mexico alumni
University of Florida alumni
Air Command and Staff College alumni
Democratic Party New Mexico state senators
21st-century American politicians
Year of birth missing (living people)